William Bennett Barracks is a Cuban professional football manager.

Career
Since 1996 until 2000, he was a head coach of the Cuba national football team. Since 2004 until 2005, he coached the Dominican Republic national football team.

References

External links

Profile at Soccerpunter.com

Year of birth missing (living people)
Living people
Cuban footballers
Cuban football managers
Cuba national football team managers
Cuban expatriate football managers
Cuban expatriates in the Dominican Republic
Expatriate football managers in the Dominican Republic
Dominican Republic national football team managers
Place of birth missing (living people)

Association footballers not categorized by position